Ganzhorn is a surname. Notable people with the surname include:

Jack Ganzhorn (1881–1956), American silent film actor and screenwriter
Wilhelm Ganzhorn (1818–1880), German judge and lyricist